Steinhagen is a municipality in the district of Gütersloh in the state of North Rhine-Westphalia, Germany. It is located on the south slope of the Teutoburg Forest, approx. 10 km west of Bielefeld and 15 km north of Gütersloh. The village is well known for producing Schnaps made from juniper berries which are distilled three times. The 
Schnaps is called Steinhäger or Schinkenhäger and can be clear or dark when unfiltered.

Geography 
Steinhagen is in the Ems River basin on the southern slopes of the Teutoburg Forest, which runs through the northwestern portion of the municipality. This mountain range is the eastern boundary of the Munsterland and of the Westphalian Bay. Steinhagen's highest point is 306 meters above sea level. The Kotte pond is 70 meters at the deepest. The city of Bielefeld is 10 km to the west and Gütersloh is 15 km to the south.

References